The Stolichna Municipality is an obshtina (municipality) in Sofia City Province, Western Bulgaria.
It is named after its administrative centre - the city of Sofia, which is also the capital of Sofia City Province and Sofia Province and the capital of Bulgaria as well.

The municipality is located mainly in the Sofia Valley, and also in the foots and lower parts of the mountains of Stara planina and Vitosha, Plana, Lozen, Rila. It is home to 1,500,927 inhabitants from which 1.400 million live in Sofia (as of 2016).

Settlements 
Sofia Capital Municipality includes the following 38 places (cities are shown in bold):

Balsha, Bankya, Bistritsa, Buhovo, Busmantsi, Chepintsi, Dobroslavtsi, Dolni Bogrov, Dolni Pasarel, German, Gorni Bogrov, Ivanyane, Jeleznitsa, Jelyava, Jiten, Kazichene, Klisura, Kokalyane, Krivina, Kubratovo, Katina, Lokorsko, Lozen, Malo Buchino, Marchaevo, Mirovyane, Mramor, Negovan, Novi Iskar, Pancharevo, Plana, Podgumer, Sofia, Svetovrachene, Vladaya, Voluyak, Voynegovtsi, Yana

Demography

Religion 
According to the latest Bulgarian census of 2011, the religious composition, among those who answered the optional question on religious identification, was the following:

References 

Geography of Sofia City Province
Municipalities of Bulgaria